Azra Jehan is a Pakistani playback singer. She is the recipient of Nigar Award which was presented to her twice.

Family
Azra Jehan is related to the Pakistani renowned singer, Noor Jehan who is her paternal aunt. Azra Jehan has a daughter named Saima Jehan who also is a singer.

Career
 Azra Jehan's Best Songs and Albums
 Azra Jehan's Film Songography

Awards
 Nigar Award in 1997 and 1999

Filmography

Punjabi
 Ameer Khan - 1989 
 Mujrim - 1989
 Allah Waris - 1990 
 Jangju Goreelay - 1990
 Khandani Badmash - 1990
 Khtarnak - 1990
 Nageena - 1990
 Mard - 1991
 Nadira - 1991	
 Nigahen - 1991
 Mastan Khan - 1991
 Nargis - 1992
 Henna - 1993
 Laat Sahib - 1994
 Lahoria - 1997
 Choorian - 1998
 Nikki Jai Haan (1999 film)
 Mehndi Waley Hath- 2000
 Buddha Gujjar - 2002
 Majajan- 2006

References

External links

Living people
Nigar Award winners
Pakistani playback singers
Pakistani women singers
Punjabi people
Year of birth missing (living people)
20th-century Pakistani women singers
21st-century Pakistani women singers